Trechus lebenbaueri is a species of ground beetle in the subfamily Trechinae. It was described by Donabauer in 2004.

References

lebenbaueri
Beetles described in 2004